Bradford is a census-designated place (CDP) and the main village in the town of Bradford in Merrimack County, New Hampshire, United States. The population of the CDP was 372 at the 2020 census, out of 1,662 in the entire town.

Geography
The CDP occupies the northeast part of the town of Bradford, at the outlet of Todd Lake. The northern border of the CDP follows the Bradford/Newbury town line, while the southern boundary follows the Warner River and its West Branch. The CDP is bordered to the east by New Hampshire Route 114. Route 114 leads north  to New London and southeast  to Henniker. New Hampshire Route 103 passes through the center of the CDP, leading east  to Interstate 89 in Warner and northwest  to Newport.

Demographics

As of the census of 2010, there were 356 people, 144 households, and 97 families residing in the CDP. There were 174 housing units, of which 30, or 17.2%, were vacant. 14 of the vacant units were seasonal or vacation properties. The racial makeup of the CDP was 95.2% white, 0.3% African American, 1.4% Native American, 0.6% Asian, 0.0% Pacific Islander, 0.3% some other race, and 2.2% from two or more races. 2.2% of the population were Hispanic or Latino of any race.

Of the 144 households in the CDP, 26.4% had children under the age of 18 living with them, 48.6% were headed by married couples living together, 11.8% had a female householder with no husband present, and 32.6% were non-families. 22.2% of all households were made up of individuals, and 7.0% were someone living alone who was 65 years of age or older. The average household size was 2.47, and the average family size was 2.88.

21.1% of residents in the CDP were under the age of 18, 9.8% were from age 18 to 24, 21.1% were from 25 to 44, 36.5% were from 45 to 64, and 11.5% were 65 years of age or older. The median age was 43.4 years. For every 100 females, there were 95.6 males. For every 100 females age 18 and over, there were 103.6 males.

For the period 2011-15, the estimated median annual income for a household was $54,583, and the median income for a family was $63,438.  The per capita income for the CDP was $21,501. 9.7% of the population and 8.8% of families were below the poverty line, along with 16.2% of people under the age of 18 and 6.8% of people 65 or older.

References

Census-designated places in New Hampshire
Census-designated places in Merrimack County, New Hampshire